Noah Rossler (born 10 April 2003) is a Luxembourgish professional footballer who plays as a right-back for Austrian club First Vienna.

Club career
Rossler joined First Vienna in July 2022.

International career
Rossler has represented Luxembourg at youth international level.

Career statistics

Club

Notes

References

2003 births
Living people
Luxembourgian footballers
Luxembourg youth international footballers
Association football defenders
Luxembourg National Division players
2. Liga (Austria) players
SV Eintracht Trier 05 players
FC Victoria Rosport players
First Vienna FC players
Luxembourgian expatriate footballers
Luxembourgian expatriate sportspeople in Germany
Expatriate footballers in Germany
Luxembourgian expatriate sportspeople in Austria
Expatriate footballers in Austria